Adderley railway station was a station serving the village of Adderley in the English county of Shropshire.

History 

The station was built by the Nantwich and Market Drayton Railway (N&MDR) and opened on 20 October 1863, although the line was operated by the Great Western Railway from its opening and the Nantwich and Market Drayton Railway was eventually amalgamated into the Great Western Railway in 1897. The line passed on to the Western Region of British Railways on nationalisation in 1948, and was then closed to passengers by the British Railways Board on 9 September 1963.

Routes

References

 
 
 
 Station on navigable O.S. map
 By Great Western to Crewe, by Bob Yate, published by The Oakwood Press

Further reading

Disused railway stations in Shropshire
Former Great Western Railway stations
Railway stations in Great Britain opened in 1863
Railway stations in Great Britain closed in 1963